Ngerekebesang Island (alternative names: Ngerekebesang Hamlet, Arakabesan) is an island in the state of Koror, Palau, where the office of the President of the Republic of Palau was located before the capital was moved to the state of Melekeok. It is composed of three towns: Ngerekebesang, Meyuns, and Echang, where most Southwest Islanders moved to after a storm struck the southwest islands. They were later resettled.

Meyuns is host to the largest hospital in Palau, Belau National Hospital. Ngerkebesang Island and the Island of Koror are connected by a causeway. The causeway, currently being remodeled, was originally built during the Japanese occupation of Palau.

References

Islands of Palau
Koror